The China vs. World Challenge was an international table tennis competition organised by the Chinese Table Tennis Association (CTTA), the International Table Tennis Federation (ITTF) and Volkswagen.

Each "China vs. World Challenge" consist in a two-day team competition in Shanghai between a China and a World all-star teams.

Results

Men's team

Women's team

References

External links 

Table tennis competitions in China